Ledgemont High School was a public high school in Thompson Township, Geauga County, Ohio.  It was the only high school in the Ledgemont Local Schools district. Their nickname was the Redskins. Due to financial problems that the district faced, the Board of Education decided to close the school, and dissolve the district. The territory of the district was transferred to Berkshire High School.

Ohio High School Athletic Association State Championships

 Boys Wrestling – 1992

External links
 District Website

Notes and references

High schools in Geauga County, Ohio
Public high schools in Ohio
2015 disestablishments in Ohio